is a passenger railway station located in the city of Tokorozawa, Saitama, Japan, operated by the private railway operator Seibu Railway.

Lines
All trains except Limited express Koedo services stop at Shin-Tokorozawa Station.

Station layout
Shin-Tokorozawa Station has two entrances, east and west, with ticket vending on the second floor level of the elevated station building.

Platforms
The station consists of two island platforms serving four tracks.

From August 2013, an experimental platform edge door system was installed for evaluation purposes at the Tokorozawa end of platform 1 for a period of approximately 8 months. The  platform edge door system jointly developed by the University of Tokyo and Kobe Steel is designed to handle trains with three or four doors per car, and the temporary installation is just one car length long.

History
The station opened on 11 June 1951, initially named . It was renamed Shin-Tokorozawa ("New Tokorozawa") on 1 February 1959.

Station numbering was introduced on all Seibu Railway lines during fiscal 2012, with Shin-Tokorozawa Station becoming "SS24".

Passenger statistics
In fiscal 2019, the station was the 17th busiest on the Seibu network with an average of 54,822 passengers daily.  

The passenger figures for previous years are as shown below.

Surrounding area

East exit
 Shin-Tokorozawa Station Koban (police box)
 U.S. Air Force Tokorozawa Transmitter Site
 National Rehabilitation Center for Persons with Disabilities (NRCD) 
 Tokorozawa Civic Gymnasium (home of Saitama Broncos Basketball Team) 
 Tokorozawa-Kita High School
 Tokorozawa Central High School
 Akikusa Gakuen High School

West exit
 Midori-chō Koban Police Box
 Midori-chō Park
 Nakasuna Park

See also
 List of railway stations in Japan

References

External links

 Shin-Tokorozawa Station information (Seibu Railway) 
 ShinTokorozawa Station information (Saitama Prefectural Government) 

Railway stations in Saitama Prefecture
Seibu Shinjuku Line
Railway stations in Tokorozawa, Saitama
Railway stations in Japan opened in 1951